Gosport and Fareham R.F.C. is a Rugby Union club located in Gosport in Hampshire, England, with home games and training taking place at Gosport Park on Dolphin Crescent.  The men's first XV currently play in London 3 South West (a league at level 8 of the English rugby union system) following their relegation from London 2 South West at the end of the 2018–19 season.  The men's second XV will play in Hampshire Premier (level 9) from the 2018–19 season.

History / Background 

Gosport and Fareham R.F.C. was founded in 1946.  In 2004 the club built a new clubhouse at a cost £800,000 funded by Sport England and various Councils.  While the 1st XV play in the London 2 South West, the 2nd XV play in the Hampshire Merit One league and the 3rd XV play in friendly matches but are looking to return to competitive rugby.  The club is a community rugby club and has a very active mini youth section from U6 - U12 (School Year 7, along with youth teams U13 - U16 (School Year 11).  There is also Colts team (U17-U18).

Honours
 Hampshire 1 champions (2): 1987–88, 1993–94
 Hampshire Plate winners: 1993
 London 2 South West champions (2): 1999–00, 2011–12
 London 2 (south-east v south-west) promotion playoff winners (2): 2000–01, 2013–14
 Hampshire Bowl winners: 2010
 Hampshire Cup winners: 2011
 London Division 3 South West champions: 2009–10

Notes

External links
 Gosport and Fareham Rugby Club website

English rugby union teams
Rugby clubs established in 1946
Rugby union clubs in Hampshire